Collegeland may refer to:
Northern Ireland
 Collegeland, County Armagh

Republic of Ireland
 Collegeland, County Dublin, a townland in Rathcoole civil parish, barony of Newcastle, County Dublin
 Collegeland, County Kildare, a townland in Maynooth civil parish, barony of North Salt, County Kildare
 Collegeland, County Meath
 Collegeland, County Westmeath, a townland in St. Mary's civil parish, barony of Brawny, County Westmeath

See also
Land-grant university